AXN Sci Fi was a European pay television series channel of Sony Pictures Television. It was available in Italy, Poland, Hungary, Ukraine, Romania, Kazakhstan and Bulgaria on Sky Italia, Boom TV, Bulsatcom, Cyfra Plus, Cyfrowy Polsat, Digi TV, Dolce, iNES, Max TV and N. The channel was launched in Czech Republic and Slovakia in October 2007.

On 11 July 2011, Sony announced that AXN Sci Fi and AXN Crime would be replaced by AXN Black and AXN White.

On 1 October, AXN Sci Fi was replaced by AXN Black, however Italy edition was unaffected.

On 28 February 2017, the channel was discontinued in Italy.

Logos

Series
Andromeda
Angel (on AXN Sci Fi Italy)
Babylon 5
BeastMaster
Blood+
Blue Gender
Captain Tsubasa
Charlie Jade
Chrono Crusade
Cowboy Bebop
D.Gray-man
Dead Like Me (on AXN Sci Fi Italy)
Death Note
Detective Conan
DICE
Doctor Who
Earth: Final Conflict
Eureka (on AXN Sci Fi Italy)
Farscape
Forbidden Science (on AXN Sci Fi Italy)
Fullmetal Alchemist
Ghost Hunters (on AXN Sci Fi Italy)
Good vs Evil
Jericho
Hellsing
Hercules: The Legendary Journeys
Honey and Clover
Kyle XY (on AXN Sci Fi Russia)
Lexx
Lost (on AXN Sci Fi Central Europe)
Mutant X
Naruto
NANA
One Piece (on AXN Sci Fi Russia)
Painkiller Jane (on AXN Sci Fi Italy)
PSI Factor
Rabbit Fall
Regenesis
Samurai 7
Sanctuary
Sheena
Slayers
Sleepwalkers
Sliders
Soul Eater
Star Trek: Enterprise
Star Trek: The Next Generation
Star Trek: The Original Series
Star Trek: Voyager
Stargate SG-1
Stargate Atlantis
Stargate Universe
The 4400 (on AXN Sci Fi Italy)
Tripping the Rift

See also
AXN
AXN Black
AXN Crime
AXN White

References

External links
 AXN Sci-Fi site, with links to the local versions

AXN
Sony Pictures Television
Sony Pictures Entertainment
Television channels and stations established in 2006
Science fiction television channels
Television networks in Bulgaria
Television in Hungary
Defunct television channels in Poland
Defunct television channels in Romania
Movie channels